The following lists events that happened during the 1610s in South Africa.

Events

Births

References
See Years in South Africa for list of References

History of South Africa